George Edward Wales (May 13, 1792 – January 8, 1860) was an American politician from Vermont who served as a U.S. Representative.

Biography
Wales was born in Westminster, Vermont, and attended the common schools in Westminster. He studied law with Stephen R. Bradley in Westminster and with Titus Hutchinson (who later served as chief justice of the Vermont Supreme Court) in Woodstock and was admitted to the bar in 1812. He moved to Hartford, Vermont, in 1813 and began the practice of law.

He served as clerk and treasurer of the White River Bridge Company from 1818 until 1825. He was a member of the Vermont House of Representatives from 1822 until 1824, and served as Speaker in 1822, 1823 and 1824. Wales earned honorary degrees from Dartmouth College in 1823 and the University of Vermont in 1825.

Wales was elected to the United States House of Representatives as a National Republican and served in the Nineteenth and Twentieth Congresses, March 4, 1825, to March 3, 1829. He was an unsuccessful candidate for reelection in 1828 to the Twenty-First Congress.
After leaving Congress he resumed the practice of law.

He later joined the Whig Party.  Wales was elected town clerk in Hartford in 1840, and served in that position until his death.  From 1847 to 1850 he was Judge of the Probate Court for the district which included Windsor County.

Wales was a trustee of Norwich University from 1845 until 1857.

Personal life
Wales married Amanda Lathrop Wales in 1813, and they had seven children.

Wales joined the Free and Accepted Masons of the State of Vermont in 1812, and was the state Grand Master from 1825 to 1827.

Death
Wales died on January 8, 1860, in Hartford, and was interred in Hartford Point Cemetery.

References

Further reading
 History of Hartford, Vermont, July 4, 1761-April 4, 1889: The First Town on the New Hampshire Grants Chartered After the Close of the French War by William Howard Tucker, published by the Free Press Association in 1889.

External links
 
 Biographical Directory of the United States Congress
 The Political Graveyard:  Wales, George Edward (1792-1860)
 govtrack.us: Rep. George Wales
 

1792 births
1860 deaths
Members of the United States House of Representatives from Vermont
Vermont National Republicans
Vermont Whigs
19th-century American politicians
Vermont state court judges
Vermont lawyers
People from Hartford, Vermont
Members of the Vermont House of Representatives
Speakers of the Vermont House of Representatives
Burials in Connecticut
National Republican Party members of the United States House of Representatives
19th-century American judges
19th-century American lawyers